(born 7 May 1949 in Meguro, Tokyo, Japan) is a Japanese manga artist who writes mostly manga for children. In 1979, she received an Excellence Prize from the Japanese Cartoonists' Association for Picola-picola, and in 1984 she received the Shogakukan Manga Award for children's manga for Panku Ponk.

References

Manga artists from Tokyo
Japanese female comics artists
Female comics writers
Living people
People from Meguro
1949 births
Japanese women writers